Sultan Abdullah Muhammad Shah I ibni Almarhum Raja Kecil Besar Abdul Rahman was the 22nd Sultan of Perak who reigned from 1851 until 1857.

Early history 
Sultan Abdullah Muhammad Shah I was the grandson of the 18th-century Sultan of Perak, Sultan Ahmaddin Shah ibni Almarhum Sultan Muhammad Shah. He succeeded his throne after the death of his cousin, Sultan Shahabuddin Riayat Shah, in 1851.

During his reign, he was involved in a civil war with Raja Muda Ngah Jaafar, who escaped Sultan Abdullah I his palace in Durian Sebatang and sought refuge in the residences of Datuk Laksamana Tok Janggut's residence.

With Sultan Abdullah I in exile, Raja Ngah Jaafar was appointed as the de facto Perak Sultan by the influential Malay ruler who sided with Sultan Abdullah in 1853. [E.A. Blundell], the British Governor of the Straits Settlements, was informed of this by Raja Ngah Jaafar, who in turn was then presented to the British presence in India. Raja Lop Yusuf, the eldest son of Sultan Abdullah I, tried to persuade the Malay leaders to continue their support to his father but failed. Sultan Abdullah I wrote to Blundell about the crisis in Perak on 23 November 1855, and also to seek help from the British. However, the request was rejected on the grounds that the British had promised not to intervene in Perak's internal affairs.

On 8 November 1856, Raja Ngah Jaafar, who was the de facto Sultan, was awarded another letter to continue to control the Long Jaafar district of Larut, which is rich in tin ore. In the same year, Raja Ngah Jaafar declared the new Sultan of Perak by the regnal name Sultan Ja'far Mua'azzam Shah.

Family 
He married Raja Sharifah Ngah Aminah binti Raja Alang Rawin They had 3 sons, Raja Lob Yusuf (later became the 27th Sultan of Perak, Sultan Yusuf Sharifuddin Muzaffar Shah, died in Sayong, Kuala Kangsar), Raja Sulaiman (died in Ligor) & Raja Pandak Abdul Rahman.

Death 
A year later, in 1857, Sultan Abdullah I died and was buried in Durian Sebatang in the county of Perak. He was posthumously conferred "Marhum Itikadullah". However, he is best known as "Marhum Durian Sebatang".

See also 
 Sultan of Perak

External links 

 http://sultan.perak.gov.my/index.php/informasi-kesultanan/senarai-sultan-perak

Sultans of Perak
1857 deaths